The 2011–12 Hartford Hawks women's basketball team represented the University of Hartford during the 2011–12 NCAA Division I women's basketball season. The team was led by head coach Jennifer Rizzotti who was entering her thirteenth season with Hartford.

Roster

Schedule

|-
!colspan=9 style=| Non-conference regular season

|-
!colspan=9 style=| America East regular season

|-
!colspan=9 style=| America East Women's Tournament

|-
!colspan=9 style=| WNIT

References

Hartford Hawks women's basketball seasons
Hartford Hawks women's b
Hartford Hawks women's b